Arthur Norman Exton-Smith  (1920–1990) was a British physician. He was known for his studies on thermoregulation and postural balance of elderly people.

References

1920 births
1990 deaths
Commanders of the Order of the British Empire
British gerontologists
20th-century English medical doctors